Lekë Dushmani was an Albanian nobleman and one of the founding members of League of Lezhë, formed on 2 March 1444.

Life 
A member of the Dushmani family he ruled over the region of Zadrima, in modern Shkodër District. In Venetian documents he is also mentioned along with his relative Damian as lord of Pult in 1446.

Leka joined the League of Lezhë, an alliance formed by their maternal uncle Skanderbeg, after meeting in the St. Nicholas Church in Lezhë on March 2, 1444. The other members included Lekë Zaharia, Peter Spani, Andrea Thopia, Gjergj Arianiti, Theodor Korona Muzaka, Stefan Crnojević, George Strez Balsha, and their subjects.  Skanderbeg was elected its leader, and commander in chief of its armed forces numbering a total of 8,000 warriors.

His descendants include among others Antonio, Sofoklis and Viktor Dousmanis.

Annotations

References

Sources 

15th-century Albanian people
14th-century Albanian people
Albanian Roman Catholics
People from Shkodër
Leke